Vaidotas Šlekys (born 11 February 1972) is a retired Lithuanian football forward, who last played for Ekranas Panevėžys.

Club career
Šlekys also played as a professional in Switzerland and Austria during his career. He never played for the Swiss club FC Chur 97 despite being with them for over a year.

International career
He obtained a total number of 32 caps for the Lithuania national football team, scoring three goals.

Honours
National Team
 Baltic Cup: 1991, 1992

References

External links
 

1972 births
Living people
Association football forwards
Lithuanian footballers
Lithuania international footballers
FK Ekranas players
FC Wil players
FC Lugano players
FC Schaffhausen players
FC Vaduz players
Expatriate footballers in Liechtenstein
SC Rheindorf Altach players
FC Chur 97 players
Lithuanian expatriate footballers
Expatriate footballers in Switzerland
Lithuanian expatriate sportspeople in Switzerland
Expatriate footballers in Austria
Lithuanian expatriate sportspeople in Austria
Lithuanian expatriate sportspeople in Liechtenstein